Jigalur is a village in Dharwad district of Karnataka, India.

Demographics 
As of the 2011 Census of India there were 208 households in Jigalur and a total population of 1,044 consisting of 554 males and 490 females. There were 115 children ages 0-6.

References

Villages in Dharwad district